A district municipality is a classification of municipalities used in the Canadian province of British Columbia.

British Columbia has 50 district municipalities that had a cumulative population of 746,125 and an average population of 14,923 in the 2011 Census. British Columbia's largest and smallest district municipalities are Saanich and Wells with populations of 109,752 and 245 respectively.

Of British Columbia's 50 district municipalities, the first to incorporate as a district municipality was North Cowichan on June 18, 1873, while the most recent community to incorporate as a district municipality was the Northern Rockies Regional Municipality (NRRM) on February 6, 2009. Although portrayed as a regional municipality in its name, the NRRM is classified as a district municipality.

List 

Notes:

Former district municipalities 

Matsqui
Sumas

See also 
List of communities in British Columbia
List of municipalities in British Columbia
List of cities in British Columbia
List of towns in British Columbia
List of villages in British Columbia
 List of regional districts in British Columbia

References 

district municipalities B